The next-generation crewed spacecraft is a type of reusable spacecraft developed and manufactured by China Aerospace Science and Technology Corporation (CASC). The prototype of the spacecraft underwent its first uncrewed test flight on 5 May 2020.

The crew carrier is designed to ferry astronauts to the Chinese space station in Earth orbit as well as conducting lunar exploration in the future. It is expected to have crewed flight capability around 2025-2026.

Overview
Intended to replace the Shenzhou spacecraft, the new vehicle is larger and lunar-capable. It consists of two modules: a crew module that returns to Earth, and an expendable service module to provide propulsion, power and life support for the crew module while in space. It is capable of carrying six astronauts, or three astronauts and 500 kg of cargo. The new crew module is partially reusable with its detachable heat shields, while the spacecraft as a whole features a modular design that allows it to be constructed to meet different mission demands. With its propulsion and power module, the crew spacecraft measures nearly 8.8 meters long. It weighs around 21600 kg fully loaded with equipment and propellant, according to the China Manned Space Agency (CMSA). Lunar missions are planned for the 2030s.

The returned test vehicle was temporarily displayed at Zhuhai Airshow in 2021.

Test flights

2016
The debut flight of Long March 7 launched at Wenchang Spacecraft Launch Site on 25 June 2016 12:00 UTC with the scaled prototype of the next-generation crewed spacecraft test vehicle, called multipurpose spacecraft scale return capsule. The capsule returned and landed successfully in the desert in north China's Inner Mongolia Autonomous Region, on 26 June 2016 07:41 UTC.

2020
The test flight of Long March 5B included two payloads. The primary payload was the next-generation crewed spacecraft test vehicle and the accompanying secondary payload was the flexible inflatable cargo re-entry capsule test capsule. Both payloads were launched successfully by the first Long March 5B rocket from the Wenchang Spacecraft Launch Site, on 5 May 2020 at 10:00 UTC. The test of the next-generation spacecraft included the evaluation of avionics, orbit performance, new heat shielding, parachute deployment and a cushioned airbag landing and recovery system. The short-duration orbital test flight concluded with re-entry and landing in remote northwestern China, on 8 May 2020.

The test of the secondary payload included the evaluation of the experimental flexible heat shield for cargo landing. The flexible inflatable cargo re-entry vehicle test vehicle was scheduled to perform re-entry on 6 May 2020 after performing orbit experiment, while the next-generation crewed spacecraft test vehicle carried out re-entry on 8 May 2020.

On 6 May 2020, the experimental cargo return craft, the flexible inflatable cargo re-entry test capsule, launched as a secondary payload on China's Long March 5B rocket, malfunctioned during its return to Earth on 6 May 2020. CMSA announced the cargo craft encountered an anomaly during re-entry and the investigation was carried out on the collected data. 

The primary payload, the unpiloted prototype for the country's next-generation crewed spacecraft, continuously raised its orbit before its landing on 8 May 2020. On 8 May, China's spacecraft successfully returned to the Dongfeng landing site in north China's Inner Mongolia Autonomous Region at 05:49 UTC, on 8 May 2020, according to the China Manned Space Agency. The test vehicle finished de-orbit burn at 05:21 UTC, followed by the separation of service and crew module at 05:33 UTC. Before re-entering into the atmosphere, the capsule executed a skip maneuver employing aerodynamic lift in the high upper atmosphere, which extended the re-entry time for vehicles. This technique was used to prevent high rate of peak heating forming in short span of time when the vehicle conducted high speed re-entry such as from the Moon to Earth. After re-entering the atmosphere, the crew module deployed three parachutes to slow its descent (whereas the Shenzhou has one parachute) and airbags to cushion the landing. According to CASC, The re-entry velocity was higher than 9 kilometers per second.

See also 
 Comparison of crewed space vehicles
 Orion (spacecraft)
 SpaceX Dragon 2
 Orel (spacecraft)

References 

Crewed spacecraft
Satellites of China
2020 in China
Spacecraft launched in 2020
Test spaceflights
Reusable spacecraft